Elliotsville may refer to:

Calumet, Ohio, and unincorporated community in Jefferson County known as Elliotsville prior to about 1880
Elliotsville, West Virginia, an unincorporated community in Taylor County